The Kazakhstani records in swimming are the fastest ever performances of swimmers from Kazakhstan, which are recognised and ratified by the Swimming Federation of the Republic of Kazakhstan.

All records were set in finals unless noted otherwise.

Long Course (50 m)

Men

Women

Mixed relay

Short Course (25 m)

Men

Women

References

Kazakhstan
Records
Swimming
Swimming